The Menter Farmstead, near Big Springs, Nebraska, United States, was listed on the National Register of Historic Places in 2011.  It is a farmstead built 1919–1928 during a regional agricultural boom sparked by winter wheat demand in World War I, and reflecting increased mechanization with its grain elevator and concrete block construction.

The most significant historic structure is the approximately  barn, built c.1919.  It has a complex roof with eaves and original wood shingles, built upon lower concrete block walls and a concrete foundation.   It has been termed a variation of the "Midwest Three Portal Barn" type.

The listing on the National Register in 2011 included several contributing and non-contributing buildings.

References

External links 

Buildings and structures in Deuel County, Nebraska
Farms on the National Register of Historic Places in Nebraska
National Register of Historic Places in Deuel County, Nebraska